Gertrud Virginia Adelborg (10 September 1853 in Karlskrona – 25 January 1942) was a Swedish teacher, feminist and leading member of the women's rights movement.

Biography
Gertrud Adelborg was born at Karlskrona in Blekinge County, Sweden. She was the daughter of Naval Captain and nobleman Bror Jacob Adelborg (1816–1865) and his wife Hedvig Catharina af Uhr (1820–1903). She was the sister of book illustrator Ottilia Adelborg (1855–1936) and textile artist Maria Adelborg (1849–1940). She never married. Adelborg was educated by a governess at home and in girls' schools. She worked as a teacher from 1874 to 1879, and was employed at Svea Court of Appeal from 1881–1883.

Adelborg was active within the Swedish women's movement and the struggle for women's suffrage. She worked for the bureau of the Fredrika Bremer Association (FBF) from 1884 to 1907 (from 1886 as chairperson of the Stockholm chapter) and was a member of the central committee of FBF from 1897 to 1915. She initiated the FBF Country School for Women at Rimforsa in Östergötland where she belonged to the school board from 1907 to 1921.

In 1899, a delegation from the FBF presented a suggestion of women's suffrage to Prime Minister Erik Gustaf Boström. The delegation was headed by Agda Montelius, accompanied by Adelborg, who had written the demand. This was the first time the Swedish women's movement themselves had officially presented a demand for suffrage.

Adelborg was a member of the central committee in the National Association for Women's Suffrage (Swedish: , LKPR) from 1903 to 1906. In 1907, she headed the LKPR delegation which presented their demand to the monarch King Oscar II of Sweden himself. She reminded Oscar II of the reforms regarding women's rights which had been passed by his father King Oscar I of Sweden, and continued by expressing her hope that "the son of Oscar I would attach his name to a suggestion of women's suffrage". According to Lydia Wahlström: "as soon as the king heard the name of his father, his interest was awoken", and Oscar II promised his support, but added that as a constitutional monarch he could not do much, and that the doubted the present government would. Adelborg's role within the suffrage work was described as important but less public: she took on secretarial tasks, made investigations, structured work and was the author of many of its publications and manifests.

Adelborg lived in retirement at Gagnef in Dalarna County. She was awarded the Swedish Royal Medal of Illis Quorum in  1907. Gertrud Adelborg died in 1942 and was buried in Gagnef.

References

Other sources
 Barbro Hedwall;  Susanna Eriksson Lundqvist, red.(2011) Vår rättmätiga plats. Om kvinnornas kamp för rösträtt (Stockholm: Albert Bonniers Förlag)  (Swedish)
Walborg Hedberg; Louise Arosenius (1914) Svenska kvinnor från skilda verksamhetsområden (Stockholm: Albert Bonniers Förlag)

Further reading 
 

1853 births
1942 deaths
People from Blekinge County 
19th-century Swedish educators
19th-century Swedish nobility
Swedish suffragists
Swedish women's rights activists
Recipients of the Illis quorum